Ruslan Lechkhadzhiev (born 2 July 1965, Gudermes) is a Russian political figure and a deputy of the 8th State Duma.

From 2004 to 2007, Lechkhadzhiev headed the branch of the Directorate of the North Caucasian Highways of the Federal Road Agency. In 2007-2021, he worked at the Department of Federal Highways "Caucasus" of the Federal Road Agency, first as the deputy chief and then as the chief. Since September 2021, he has served as deputy of the 8th State Duma.

On 24 March 2022, the United States Treasury sanctioned him in response to the 2022 Russian invasion of Ukraine.

References

1965 births
Living people
United Russia politicians
21st-century Russian politicians
Eighth convocation members of the State Duma (Russian Federation)
People from Gudermes
Russian individuals subject to the U.S. Department of the Treasury sanctions